Lunaria, common names honesty, dollar plant, money-in-both-pockets, money plant, moneywort, moonwort, and silver dollar; is a genus of flowering plants in the family Brassicaceae. It is native to central and southern Europe  and North America. Species include:
L. annua (syn. L. biennis), annual or biennial 
L. elongata
L. rediviva, perennial
L. telekiana. rare Balkan species

The Latin name Lunaria means "moon-like" and refers to the plants' decorative seedpods.

They have hairy toothed leaves and terminal racemes of white or violet flowers in Spring and Summer, followed by prominent, translucent, disc-shaped seedpods, which are frequently seen in flower arrangements.

They are widely grown as ornamental plants in gardens, and have become naturalised in many temperate areas away from their native habitat.

Gallery

See also
Money plant

References

Brassicaceae
Brassicaceae genera
Garden plants